Order of Justice is one of the badges of honor in Iran, established by " The Council of Iran Ministers" on November 21, 1990. According to "Article 10" of the "Regulations on the Awarding of Government Orders" of Iran, the "Order of Justice" is awarded to those who have contributed to the enforcement of divine decrees and the establishment of law and justice in society or who have a good judicial and aptitude record, in some of the following ways:

 Scientific and technical work on the formulation of laws
 Brilliant history in judiciary or legislative
 Defending truth, justice, and the rights of people
 Detection and prosecution of crimes

Recipients

Types
The "Order of Justice" has three types of medal:

See also
 Order of Freedom (Iran)
 Order of Altruism
 Order of Work and Production
 Order of Research
 Order of Mehr
 Order of Construction
 Order of Knowledge
 Order of Education and Pedagogy
 Order of Persian Politeness
 Order of Independence (Iran)
 Order of Service
 Order of Courage (Iran)
 Order of Culture and Art
 Order of Merit and Management
 Order of Fath
 Order of Islamic Republic
 Order of Nasr

References

External links
 Orders of Iran Regulations in diagrams
 Orders of Iran in diagrams
 Types of Iran's badges and their material benefits

Awards established in 1990
Civil awards and decorations of Iran
1990 establishments in Iran